Lee Seung-hyun is a Korean name consisting of the family name Lee and the given name Seung-hyun, and may also refer to:

 Lee Seoung-hyun (born 1990), South Korean basketball player
 Lee Seung-hyun (footballer) (born 1985), South Korean footballer
 Lee Seung-hyun (baseball), South Korean baseball player
 Seungri (born 1990), South Korean singer
 Lee Seung-hyun (esports player) (born 1997), better known as "Life", South Korean StarCraft II player